Three ships of the Royal Navy have been named HMS Bicester, named after (the fox hunt in) Bicester, Oxfordshire.

  was a  minesweeper that served in World War I.
  was a  that served in World War II.

References

Royal Navy ship names